Juncus tweedyi (syn. Juncus brevicaudatus), the narrow-panicled rush, is a species of flowering plant in the family Juncaceae. It is native to southern Canada, and the northern USA, extending down the mountain ranges. A perennial reaching , it is typically found in wet areas, such as the edges of beaver ponds.

References

tweedyi
Flora of Western Canada
Flora of Eastern Canada
Flora of the Northwestern United States
Flora of Arizona
Flora of Utah
Flora of North Dakota
Flora of Minnesota
Flora of Wisconsin
Flora of the Northeastern United States
Flora of Tennessee
Flora of North Carolina
Flora of Virginia
Plants described in 1900